The Balkan mountain range (known locally also as Stara planina) is a mountain range in the eastern part of the Balkan Peninsula in Southeastern Europe. The range is conventionally taken to begin at the peak of Vrashka Chuka on the border between Bulgaria and Serbia.

In much of the central and eastern sections, the summit forms the watershed between the drainage basins of the Black Sea and the Aegean. A prominent gap in the mountains is formed by the sometimes narrow Iskar Gorge, a few miles north of the Bulgarian capital, Sofia. The karst relief determines the large number of caves, including Magura, featuring the most important and extended European post-Palaeolithic cave painting, Ledenika, Saeva dupka, Bacho Kiro, etc. The most notable rock formation are the Belogradchik Rocks in the west.

There are several important protected areas: Central Balkan National Park, Vrachanski Balkan, Bulgarka and Sinite Kamani, as well as a number of nature reserves. The Balkan Mountains are remarkable for their flora and fauna. Edelweiss grows there in the region of Kozyata stena. Some of the most striking landscapes are included in the Central Balkan National Park with steep cliffs, the highest waterfalls in the Balkan Peninsula and lush vegetation. There are a number of important nature reserves such as Chuprene, Kozyata stena and others. Most of Europe's large mammals inhabit the area including the brown bear, wolf, boar, chamois and deer.

The mountains are the source of the name of the Balkan Peninsula.

Etymology 

It is believed the name was brought to the region in the 7th century by Bulgars who applied it to the area, as a part of the First Bulgarian Empire. In Bulgarian, the archaic word balkan (балкан) was borrowed from Turkic and means "mountain". It may have ultimately derived from the Persian bālkāneh or bālākhāna, meaning "high, above, or proud house." The name is still preserved in Central Asia with the Balkan Daglary (Balkan Mountains) and the Balkan Province of Turkmenistan. In Turkish    means "a chain of wooded mountains."

In Antiquity and the Middle Ages the mountains were known by their Thracian name: the Haemus Mons. Scholars consider that the name Haemus (Αἷμος) is derived from a Thracian word *saimon, 'mountain ridge'. The name of the place where the range meets the Black Sea, Cape Emine, is derived from Aemon. A folk etymology holds that 'Haemus' derives from the Greek word "haima" meaning 'blood', and is based on Greek mythology. During a fight between Zeus and the monster/titan Typhon, Zeus injured Typhon with thunder; and Typhon's blood fell on the mountains, which were then named for this battle.

Other names used to refer to the mountains in different time periods include Aemon, Haemimons, Hem, Emus, the Slavonic Matorni gori and the Turkish Kocabalkan.

Geography 
Geologically, the Balkan Mountains are a mountain chain of fold mountains, a "young" part of the Alp-Himalayan chain that stretches across most of Europe and Asia. It can be divided into two parts: the main Balkan Chain and the Pre-Balkans (Fore-Balkan) to the north, which intrude slightly into the Danubian Plain. To the south, the mountains border the Sub-Balkan valleys - a row of 11 valleys running from the Bulgarian border with Serbia east to the Black Sea, separating the Balkan mountains from a chain of other mountains known as Srednogorie which includes Vitosha and Sredna Gora.

The range consists of around 30 distinct mountains. Within Bulgaria the Balkan Mountains can be divided into three sections: 
The eastern Balkan Mountains form the lowest part of the range.

{| class="wikitable"
|+ Distribution of the height belts in Stara Planina! width="90" | Section
! width="65" | Area,km2
! width="30" | %
! width="65" | Average altitude, m
! width="65" | 0 – 200 m, km2
! width="30" | %
! width="65" | 200 – 600 m, km2
! width="30" | %
! width="70" | 600 – 1000 m, km2
! width="30" | %
! width="80" | 1000 – 1600 m, km2
! width="30" | %
! width="70" | over 1600 m, km2
! width="30" | %
|-
| Western Balkan Mountains|| align="right" | 4 196,9 || align="right" | 36.19 || align="right" | 849 || align="right" | – || align="right" | – || align="right" | 907.1 || align="right" | 21.61 || align="right" | 2 074,9 || align="right" | 49.44 || align="right" | 1 139,6 || align="right" | 27.15 || align="right" | 75.3 || align="right" | 1.79
|-
| Central Balkan Mountains || align="right" | 3 400,9 || align="right" | 29.33 || align="right" | 961 || align="right" | – || align="right" | – || align="right" | 549.8 || align="right" | 16.17 || align="right" | 1 512,7 || align="right" | 44.48 || align="right" | 1 076,7 || align="right" | 31.66 || align="right" | 261.7 || align="right" | 7.70
|-
| Eastern Balkan Mountains || align="right" | 3 998,6 || align="right" | 34.48 || align="right" | 385 || align="right" | 560 || align="right" | 14.00 || align="right" | 2 798,9 || align="right" | 70.00 || align="right" | 624.1 || align="right" | 15.61 || align="right" | 15.6 || align="right" | 0.39 || align="right" | – || align="right" | —
|-
| Total' || align="right" | 11 596,4 || align="right" | 100 || align="right" | 722 || align="right" | 560 || align="right" | 4.83 || align="right" | 4 255,8 || align="right" | 36.70 || align="right" | 4 211,7 || align="right" | 36.32 || align="right" | 2 231,9 || align="right" | 19.25 || align="right" | 337 || align="right" | 2.91
|}

 Hydrology 

In their central and eastern sections, the mountains form a water divide between the rivers flowing to the Danube in the north and those flowing to the Aegean Sea in the south. However, they are crossed by Bulgaria's longest river, the Iskar, which forms the Iskar Gorge. Rivers that take their source from the Balkan Mountains and flow northwards to the Danube include the Timok, Archar, Lom, Tsibritsa, Ogosta, Skat, Vit, Osam, Yantra, and Rusenski Lom. The mountains are also the source of the Kamchiya, which flows directly into the Black Sea. Although not so abundant in mineral waters as other parts of Bulgaria, there are several spas such as Varshets, Shipkovo and Voneshta Voda.

There are a number of waterfalls, especially in the western and central parts of the range, such as Raysko Praskalo which is the highest waterfall in the Balkan Peninsula, Borov Kamak, Babsko Praskalo, Etropole Waterfall, Karlovsko Praskalo, Skaklya and others. Developments in the recent two decades completely changed the geography of Serbia, when it comes to waterfalls. Area of the Stara Planina has always been sparsely populated and inaccessible because of the rugged and forested terrain, but also as a location of the Serbian-Bulgarian border. As armies relinquished the borders giving control to the border police, civilians were allowed to explore the area. As a result, higher and higher waterfalls have been discovered on the Serbian side of the Stara Planina since then: Čungulj in 1996 - ; Pilj in 2002 - ; Kopren in 2011 - ; Kaluđerski Skokovi in 2012 - .

 Passes 

The mountains are crossed by 20 passes and two gorges. There are paved roads crossing the Balkan Mountains at the following passes (listed from west to east):
 Petrohan Pass: Sofia - Montana
 Iskar Gorge (Iskarski prolom): Sofia - Vratsa (also railroad)
 Vitinya Pass: Hemus motorway (A2), Sofia - Botevgrad
 Beklemeto Pass: Troyan - Sopot
 Shipka Pass: Gabrovo - Kazanlak (also railroad)
 Pass of the Republic (Prohod na republikata): Veliko Tarnovo - Gurkovo
 Vratnik Pass: Elena - Sliven
 Kotel Pass (Kotlenski prohod): Kotel - Petolachka (Pentagram) crossroads
 Varbitsa Pass (Varbishki prohod): Shumen - Petolachka crossroads
 Rish Pass (Rishki prohod): Shumen - Karnobat
 Luda Kamchiya Gorge (Ludokamchiyski prolom): Provadiya - Karnobat (also railroad)
 Aytos Pass (Aytoski prohod) - Provadiya - Aytos
 Dyulino Pass (Dyulinski prohod): Varna - Aytos
 Obzor Pass (Obzorski prohod): Varna - Burgas, future Cherno More motorway (A5)

 Peaks 
 Botev Peak  (named after Hristo Botev)
 Malkiyat yumruk 
 Golyam Kademliya (Triglav) 
 Mlechen chal 
 Zhaltets 
 Paradzhika 
 Vezhen Peak 
 Midžor , the highest peak in Serbia proper and north-western Bulgaria, 12th in the Balkan Mountains.
 Golyam Kupen 
 Levski  (named after Vasil Levski)
 Yurushka gramada 
 Martinova chuka 
 Malak Kupen 
 Tetevenska Baba 
 Buluvaniya 
 Golyam Krastets 
 Kostenurkata (The Turtle) 
 Oba 
 Kartala 
 Pascal 
 Ravnets 
 Kom Peak 
 Kositsa 
 Replyanska tsarkva 
 Golema chuka 
 Svishti plaz 
 Mara Gidia 
 Todorini Kukli 
 Haydushki kamak 
 Murgash 
 Koznitsa 
 Chukava (Golema mountain) 
 Gorno Yazovo 
 Chumerna 
 Ispolin 
 Ravno buche 
 Buzludzha 
 Manyakov kamak 
 Guvnishte 
 Golemi Del 
 Vetren Peak 
 Shipka (Stoletov, St. Nikola) 
 Goten (Sofiiska mountain) 
 Petrovski krast 

 History 

The Balkan Mountains have had a significant and special place in the history of Bulgaria since its founding in 681. It was a natural fortress of the Bulgarian Empire for centuries and formed an effective barrier to Moesia where most of the medieval capitals were located. The Balkan mountains were the site of numerous battles between the Bulgarian and Byzantine Empires including the Battle of the Rishki Pass (759), Battle of the Varbitsa Pass (811), the Battle of Tryavna (1190) and the Battle of Devina (1279). In the battle of the Varbitsa Pass, Khan Krum decisively defeated an enormous Byzantine army, killing Emperor Nikephoros I. For many centuries the Byzantines feared these mountains, and on several occasions Byzantine armies pulled back on approaching the Balkan Mountains.

During the Ottoman rule, many haiduks found refuge in the Balkan Mountains. Close to the highest summit, Botev Peak, is Kalofer, the birthplace of Hristo Botev, a Bulgarian poet and national hero who died in the western Balkan Mountains near Vratsa in 1876 in the struggle against the Ottoman Empire. Also close to Botev Peak is Shipka Pass, the scene of the four battles in the Russo-Turkish War, 1877-78, which ended Turkish rule in the Balkans.

 Protection 
 Bulgaria 

Significant areas of the Balkan mountains are under protection by Bulgarian law, including one national park — Central Balkan National Park; three nature parks — Vrachanski Balkan Nature Park, Bulgarka Nature Park and Sinite Kamani Nature Park, over 20 nature reserves, as well as numerous natural landmarks. 

Central Balkan National Park is among the largest and most valuable of the protected areas in Europe. Since 2017, its ancient beech forests have been included in the Primeval Beech Forests UNESCO World Heritage Site. It is the third largest protected territory in Bulgaria, spanning an area of 716.69 km² with total length of 85 km from the west to the east and an average width of 10 km. Within its territory are located the highest summit of the mountain range, Botev Peak (2376 m), as well as the highest waterfall in the Balkan peninsula Raysko Praskalo (124.5 m). The rugged and diverse relief determines the presence numerous gorges, cliffs, waterfalls and caves, including Raychova Dupka, the second deepest cave discovered in Bulgaria and in the mountain range, reaching depth of -377 m.

The flora of Central Balkan National Park is diverse and consists of 1689 species of vascular plants, 45 species of algae and 238 species of mosses. These include 23 Bulgarian endemic species, such as leafy primrose (Primula frondosa), which is only found within the park's boundaries, Аlchemilla аchtarowii, Alchemilla jumrukczalica, Betonica bulgarica, Centaurea davidovii, as well as another 75 Balkan endemics. 

The vertebrate fauna of Central Balkan National Park consists of 309 species. The number of mammal species is 60, including animals of high conservation value, such as brown bear, gray wolf, wildcat, marbled polecat, European pine marten, Eurasian otter, the only population of chamois within the mountain range, European ground squirrel, lesser mole-rat, European snow vole, etc. The avifauna includes 220 species, of which 123 are nesting. The park is important for the protection of the eastern imperial eagle, saker falcon, Eurasian eagle-owl, Eurasian pygmy owl, Ural owl, boreal owl, white-backed woodpecker, semicollared flycatcher and corn crake. The park's herpetofauna includes 15 reptile and nine amphibian species. It hosts population of national importance of common European adder, viviparous lizard and common frog. Due to the park's high altitude, the ichthyofauna consists of six fish species, with brown trout being the dominant one. 

Vrachanski Balkan Nature Park is situated in the western section of the mountain range and spans an area of 301.29 km². Its territory includes some of the most extensive karst areas in Bulgaria with over 600 caves, such as Ledenika, the gorge Vratsata whose 400 m vertical cliffs are the highest in the Balkans, and numerous waterfalls, such as Skaklia (141 m drop but unlike Raysko Praskalo it is seasonal) and Borov Kamak (63 m drop). The flora includes 1082 species of vascular plants and 186 species of mosses. The endemism is lowers when compared to the Central Balkan National Park — 6 Bulgarian and another 36 Balkan endemic species. The vertebrate fauna encompasses 276 species. The recorded mammal species are 58 and include gray wolf, golden jackal, wildcat, marbled polecat, European polecat, European pine marten and 22 bat species. The birds are 181 species, including 124 nesting ones. Typical species are the golden eagle, long-legged buzzard, peregrine falcon, Eurasian eagle-owl, Alpine chough, Alpine swift, Eurasian crag martin, red-rumped swallow, wallcreeper, etc. There are 15 reptile and 11 amphibian species; of them important populations exist of the meadow lizard, European copper skink, Balkan crested newt, as well as the only habitat in Bulgaria of the northern crested newt, which is also its southernmost locality worldwide. 

There have been successful efforts in the reintroduction of two vulture species that went extinct from the mountain range in the past several decades. In 2021 the first cinereous vulture in Bulgaria in nearly 30 years hatched in Kotel mountains in the eastern section of the mountain range, thus establishing the second breeding colony in the Balkans, after the one in north-eastern Greece. In recent years, several breeding pairs of griffon vulture have established themselves in the Vratsa Balkan to the west, as well as in the eastern sections of the Balkan Mountains. The eastern Balkan Mountains are among the priority areas in the reintroduction programme for the bearded vulture. Since the early XXI century there have been several records of the Eurasian lynx, which has been considered extincts in Bulgaria since the 1940s, in a number of localities along the Balkan Mountains.

 Serbia 

First group of trees was protected in 1966, followed by the creation of 7 special nature reserves and 3 natural monuments in the 1980s. The protected area was expanded in 2020.

The sediments extend from the Paleozoic to the Cenozoic eras. Limestone terrain is known for the short losing streams and tufaceous waterfalls. There are canyons and gorges, like those of the Toplodolska reka and Rosomačka reka rivers. Underground waters on the mountain reach the surface in the forms of common springs, well-springs (vrelo) and diffused springs (pištevina). The strongest spring is the intermittent Jelovičko vrelo, known for its fluctuations, characterized by the bubbling and foaming.

Montane ecosystems are diverse and include several plant communities: forests, shrubs, meadows, pastures and peatlands. There are six different vegetation zone in the park. Oak, beech, spruce, subalpine zone of the shrub vegetation of common horsetail, blueberry, subalpine spruce and mugo pine. Other plants include shrub alder, steppe pedunculate oak, but also rare and endangered species like European pasqueflower, yellow pheasant's eye, Kosovo peony, common sundew, Heldreich's maple, martagon lily, pygmy iris and marsh orchid. In total, there are 1,190 plant species, including a locally endemic winged bellflower (Campanula calyciliata) and Pančić's frog grass (Senecio pancicii), which can be found only on the mountain. There are also communities of mountainous sphagnum bogs on the localities of Jabučko Ravnište, Babin Zub and Arbinje. Some 350 herb species are considered medicinal or aromatic. In 2022, several independent surveys from various universities and institutes were conducted, in order to list all of them, to enhance their protection, and to check possibilities for potential plantation production. Vast areas south and southeast from the mountain are already transformed into the aromatic herbs plantations, especially the entire slopes of the nearby mountains being planted with lavender.

In the 1980s, fossils of Thecodontosaurus'' were discovered on the mountain. It is one of the oldest recorded species of dinosaurs, and the remains are estimated to be some 250 million years old.

Some 190 species of butterflies are recorded. The area is a salmonid region, inhabited by the riverine brown trout. Another 25 species of fish live in the rivers and streams, so as the fire salamander and newts. There are 203 species of birds, of which 154 are nesting in the park, 10 are wintering, 30 are passing and 13 are wandering. Important species include golden eagle, Ural owl and hawk. The griffon vulture disappeared from the region in the late 1940s. In 2017 a program for their reintroduction began within the scope of a wider European program. Among other things, the feeders will be placed along the vultures' migratory route. Over 30 mammalian species are found in the park, including lesser mole-rat, hazel dormouse and the Tertiary relict, European snow vole. Brown bear became extinct in Serbian part, but evidence showing the presence of the bears were found in 2014. The bears have been photographed in 2015, before disappearing again until 2019 when a young brown bear was filmed on camera.

Human heritage spans from the prehistoric remains, Classical antiquity including the Roman period and late mediaeval monastic complexes. Some of those older monuments are fragmentary and relocated from their original locations. There are numerous examples of the ethnic edifices characteristic for the architecture of the region in the late 19th and early 20th century (houses, barns, etc.)

Serbian section of the mountain is seen as a location for dozens of micro hydros, mini power plants which caused problem with the environmentalists and local population. Even the Ministry for environmental protection halted some of the projects and litigated with the investors. They also announced the change of the Nature protection law, which will permanently forbid the construction of plants in protected areas. In order to prevent further degradation, the Nature Park Stara Planina was nominated for the UNESCO's Man and the Biosphere Programme and for the world list of geoparks, while over tens of thousands of citizens signed petitions against the micro hydros and numerous protests have been organized by the local population. This prompted similar protests in other parts of Serbia and the association "Defend the rivers of Stara Planina" was founded, which expanded its base of operations outside of the Stara Planina region. The activism resulted in various physical altercation between the local citizens on one, and contractors and their security guards on the other side, amidst the police interventions.

In October 2018, Minister of Environmental Protection Goran Trivan, said that the current law allows for the micro hydros to be built in the protected areas. The government allowed the construction of 800 micro hydros, which has been described as "megalomaniacal" by the ecologists, as they would produce less than 1% of the total electricity. Environmentalists also accused the government of destroying the plant and animal life using the pretext of renewable energy. In September 2019, Pirot city administration announced it is removing from the spatial plan all 43 existing locations for the micro hydros on the protected area of Stara Planina. There are 15 locations remaining in the unprotected sector of the mountain, but city officials announced abolishing of these locations in the future, too.

See also 
 Balkans
 Kom–Emine, a high-mountain long-distance trail along the main ridge of the Balkan Mountains
 List of mountain ranges
 Rhodope Mountains, Rila, Pirin, Dinaric Alps, Šar mountain, Pindus, Strandzha – other major mountain chains in the Balkan region

Notes and references

References

External links 

 Regional tourist association
 Euroregion Stara Planina
 Hiking in Balkan Mountains 
 Controversy regarding ski resort development in ostensibly protected areas. (World Birdwatch, March 2009)
 Tourist portal Stara Planina 

 
Mountain ranges of Bulgaria
Mountain ranges of Serbia
Protected areas of Serbia
Balkans
International mountains of Europe
Bulgaria–Serbia border
Geography of Southeastern Europe
Landforms of Vidin Province
Landforms of Burgas Province
Landforms of Plovdiv Province
Landforms of Sofia Province
Landforms of Sofia City Province
Landforms of Veliko Tarnovo Province
Landforms of Sliven Province
Landforms of Montana Province
Landforms of Vratsa Province
Landforms of Lovech Province
Landforms of Stara Zagora Province
Landforms of Gabrovo Province
Landforms of Shumen Province
Landforms of Varna Province
Landforms of Blagoevgrad Province
Euroregions of Bulgaria
Euroregions of Serbia